Ågskardet is a village in the municipality of Meløy in Nordland county, Norway. There were 127 inhabitants in 2008.

The village lies along Norwegian County Road 17, with a ferry connection to a port, just west of the village of Halsa.  The ferry is the only connection to the rest of Meløy Municipality to the north. The village is situated just north of the border with Rødøy Municipality. The village has its own school, chapel/community centre, and some private companies.

References

External links
Official website

Meløy
Villages in Nordland
Populated places of Arctic Norway